
Gmina Iwonicz-Zdrój is an urban-rural gmina (administrative district) in Krosno County, Subcarpathian Voivodeship, in south-eastern Poland.

Villages
Apart from the town of Iwonicz-Zdrój, the gmina contains the villages (sołectwos) of Iwonicz, Lubatowa and Lubatówka.

Neighbouring gminas
Gmina Iwonicz-Zdrój is bordered by the gminas of Dukla, Miejsce Piastowe and Rymanów.

References
Polish official population figures 2006

Iwonicz-Zdroj
Gmina Iwonicz Zdroj